SCTbio is global contract development and manufacturing organization (CDMO) providing cGMP services of Advanced Therapy Medicinal Products (ATMPs). It operates in Europe and North America. The company has strong expertise in the development of autologous cell-based products, cell banking and all needle-to-needle GMP operations, including a validated apheresis collection sites network, product manufacturing, QC, GMP storage, QA/QP release, and worldwide drug products supply for clinical and commercial scale.

Founding 
SCTbio was founded in 2021 and is a part of the larger PPF Biotech network. SCTbio was initially part of the SOTIO group, providing drug development and manufacturing capabilities. On July 1, 2021, SOTIO implemented an official split into two sister companies, SCTbio and SOTIO Biotech.

Operations 
SCTbio conducts global operations in Europe and in the USA. The cGMP cell manufacturing facility is based in Prague, Czech Republic. The GMP facility features over 2,000 square meters of total space, including 420 square meters of total clean room area (4,520 sq ft). SCTbio offers the ability to of manufacture genetically modified products that require the separation of viral and non-viral components. The physical segregation minimizes any risk of cross-contamination.

Services 

 CGMP Manufacturing and Quality control: SCTbio provides full production services covering autologous, or allogenic cell and gene therapy products, and in collaboration with sister Cambridge facility recently expanded to the area of viral vectors. SCTbio leads manufacturing processes from various starting materials, including apheresis products, whole blood, and tumor tissues. The company also conducts quality control testing based on a variety of cellular and molecular methods and provides rapid sterility testing.

 Analytical Development: SCTbio conducts development, optimization and implementation of analytical methods, including expertise in cellular, flow cytometry, molecular and microbiology-based methods, provided with the development of standard operating procedures, as well as contributing to methods qualification and validation.

 Process Development: SCTbio contributes to the design and development of customized manufacturing procedures, in line with cGMP standards to create new working instructions and standard operating procedures, as well as developing technology transfer plans and execution.

 Logistics Services & Apheresis Collection: SCTbio has contributed to a number of clinical trials and developed their logistical services while operating under SOTIO. They have a vast network of logistical services that include shipping and validation of apheresis products and provide technical expertise on the harvesting of peripheral blood mononuclear cells.

 Procurement & Warehouse Management: SCTbio participates in the procurement of raw materials for product development and adheres to GxP practices. The company has its own storage facility in Prague that provides different controlled temperature  from -190° (liquid nitrogen) to room temperature.

 Quality and Regulatory Support: SCTbio provides support and services for quality system checks in the European Union, United Kingdom, and United States. They oversee the final drug products in each of these markets and have flexible quality systems that are in line with the territories that they are established, using electronic Quality Systems and Quality Document management systems that implement custom design and monitoring capabilities.

Leadership 
SCTbio is led by CEO, Luděk Sojka, who previously served as the COO and CTO of SOTIO. Through his time at SOTIO he was responsible for creating the SOTIO GMP facilities in Prague, Czech Republic and Beijing, China. He has been part of the PPF Biotech network and SOTIO since 2011.

References 

Biotechnology
Life sciences industry
Biotechnology companies of the Czech Republic
PPF Group